Vyšehoří is a municipality and village in Šumperk District in the Olomouc Region of the Czech Republic. It has about 300 inhabitants.

Etymology
The name Vyšehoří is derived from výše v horách, i.e. "higher in the mountains". It refers to its hilly location.

Geography
It lies mostly in the Zábřeh Highlands.

History
The first written mention of Vyšehoří is from 1397, when it became property of Petr of Kravaře. The Lords of Kravaře owned it as part of the Ruda estate until 1442, when they sold the estate to the Tunkl of Brníčko family. Vyšehoří became part of the Zábřeh estate, which remained so until fall of the feudal system in 1848.

References

External links

Villages in Šumperk District